Located on Roman province of Dacia, present-day Romania, the Limes Porolissensis was a defensive line organized on 2nd century AD after the Conquest of Dacia, having observations towers, short cut-off walls fortifications, integrating the following castra:
 Castra of Negreni
 Castra of Buciumi
 Castra of Largiana
 Castra of Certinae
 Porolissum
 Castra of Jac
 Castra of Tihău
 Castra of Samum
  Castra of Arcobara
 Castra of Livezile
 Castra of Orheiu Bistriței
 Castra of Brâncovenești

References
Defensive strategies and trans-border policies at the Lower Danube
Alexandru V. Matei, Robert Gindele - Roman defensive system from north-western part of Dacia. Field researches at Supuru de Sus (Satu Mare County) and literature sources.
Comuna Buciumi, important areal de convergenţă turistică
About the tactics and fighting particularity of the auxiliary infantry in Roman Dacia

External links
Roman castra from Romania - Google Maps / Earth 

Roman frontiers
Roman Dacia
Roman fortifications in Romania